North (or Northern) Lanarkshire was a county constituency of the House of Commons of the Parliament of the United Kingdom (Westminster) from 1868 to 1885 and from 1918 to 1983. It elected one Member of Parliament (MP) by the first past the post voting system.

Boundaries

1868 to 1885 

The Representation of the People (Scotland) Act 1868 provided that the North Lanarkshire constituency was to consist of the parishes of Avondale, Barony, Blantyre, Bothwell, Cadder, Cambuslang, Carmunnock, City Parish of Glasgow, Dalziel, East Kilbride, Glassford, Hamilton, New Monkland, Old Monkland, Rutherglen and so much of the parishes of Govan and of Cathcart as is situated in Lanarkshire.

1918 to 1983 

From 1918 the Northern Lanarkshire constituency consisted of "The parts of the Lower Ward and Middle Ward County Districts which are contained within the parishes of Glasgow, Cadder, New Monkland, Shotts, and Cambusnethan, exclusive of any burghs or portions of burghs situated therein."

Members of Parliament

MPs 1868–1885

MPs 1918–1983

Election results

Elections 1868–1885

Elections in the 1910s

Elections in the 1920s

Elections in the 1930s

Election in the 1940s

Elections in the 1950s

Elections in the 1960s

Elections in the 1970s

References 

Lanarkshire
Historic parliamentary constituencies in Scotland (Westminster)
Constituencies of the Parliament of the United Kingdom established in 1868
Constituencies of the Parliament of the United Kingdom disestablished in 1885
Constituencies of the Parliament of the United Kingdom established in 1918
Constituencies of the Parliament of the United Kingdom disestablished in 1983